East Punjab (known simply as Punjab from 1950) was a province and later a state of India from 1947 until 1966, consisting of the parts of the Punjab Province of British India that went to India following the partition of the province between India and Pakistan by the Radcliffe Commission in 1947. The mostly Muslim western parts of the old Punjab became Pakistan's West Punjab, later renamed as Punjab Province, while the mostly Hindu and Sikh eastern parts went to India.

History

Partition of India

With the partition of the Presidencies and provinces of British India, the Punjab province was to be divided in two as per the Indian Independence Act 1947, passed by the parliament of the United Kingdom. The province as constituted under the Government of India Act 1935 was to cease to exist, and two new provinces were to be constituted, to be known respectively as West Punjab & East Punjab. The princely states of the Punjab region (which had not been British possessions, so could not be partitioned by the British) all (except Bahawalpur, which acceded to the Dominion of Pakistan) acceded to the new Dominion of India and were combined into the Patiala and East Punjab States Union (PEPSU). The northeast Hill States of the Punjab Province banded together and were declared a union territory in 1950 as Himachal Pradesh.

Renaming of the state

The Constitution of India, which came into effect in 1950, renamed the province of "East Punjab" as the state of "Punjab".

Reorganisation of Indian States

In 1956, the PEPSU was merged into an expanded Punjab state.

Punjabi Suba movement

With effect from 1 November 1966, there was yet another reorganisation, this time on linguistic lines, when the state of Punjab as constituted in 1956 was divided into three: the mostly Hindi-speaking part became the present-day Indian state of Haryana and the mostly Punjabi-speaking part became the present-day Punjab, while a new union territory (Chandigarh) was also created, to serve as a capital to both states. At the same time, some parts of the former territory of Patiala and East Punjab States Union, including Solan and Nalagarh, were transferred to Himachal Pradesh.

Demography

1941 census 

Prior to partition, the eastern portion of Punjab that was ultimately awarded to India following the demarcation of the Radcliffe Line was made into a new province – East Punjab. The area includes the contemporary states of Punjab, Haryana, and Himachal Pradesh. Below is the religious demographics of this region broken down by district and princely state with an overall total as per the 1941 Indian census.

2011 census 

East Punjab comprising the states of Punjab, Haryana, Himachal Pradesh and Chandigarh had a population of 61,014,852 people as of 2011 census report of India. The Hindus form a majority in East Punjab region with 40,234,605 adherents comprising (65.94%), Sikhs are 17,466,731 comprising (28.62%) of the region, Muslims are 2,518,159 comprising (4.12%) of the region and others are 795,357 including Christians, Buddhists, Jains, and atheists together comprising remaining (1.3%) of the region. Sikhs are the majority in Punjab, while Hindus form the majority in Haryana, Himachal Pradesh, and Chandigarh.

Modern usage
Since it ceased to be the name of a state, "East Punjab" has been used in India to refer to the eastern part of the present Punjab state, while in Pakistan it means the eastern part of Pakistan's Punjab province, although Pakistanis also sometimes refer to the current Indian Punjab as "East Punjab".
Terms East and West Punjab are also often used in modern India and Pakistan when making a comparison between the two territories.

Administrative division
There are 23 districts in the State of Punjab.

See also
History of Punjab
 West Punjab
 Punjab region

Notes

References

1947 establishments in India
1966 disestablishments in India
Geography of Punjab, India
History of Punjab, India (1947–present)
Former states and territories of India